The 2010–11 season was Stranraer's second consecutive season in the Scottish Third Division, having been relegated from the Scottish Second Division at the end of the 2008–09 season. Stranraer also competed in the Challenge Cup, League Cup and the Scottish Cup.

Summary
Stranraer finished fifth in the Third Division. They reached the first round of the Challenge Cup, the first round of the League Cup, and the fifth round of the Scottish Cup.

Results and fixtures

Scottish Third Division

Scottish Challenge Cup

Scottish League Cup

Scottish Cup

Player statistics

Squad 

|}

League table

References

Stranraer
2010andndash;11